Theo Ditzler (9 August 1936 – 27 January 2014) was a Swiss sports shooter. He competed in the 50 metre rifle, prone event at the 1972 Summer Olympics.

References

1936 births
2014 deaths
Swiss male sport shooters
Olympic shooters of Switzerland
Shooters at the 1972 Summer Olympics
Place of birth missing